Gordon Hamersley is an American chef based in Boston and cookbook author. Arguably his roast chicken is his most acclaimed recipe.  It was part of a meal he cooked for Julia Child in her show In Julia's Kitchen with Master Chefs. His personal trademark is his ever-present Red Sox cap.

His book Bistro Cooking At Home, which he wrote with Joanne McAllister Smart, won the International Association of Culinary Professionals won the 2004 Cookbook Award in the Chefs and Restaurants Category.

Biography
In the 1970s he enrolled in Boston University (CGS’71, SED’74) where he trained at some French restaurants within the Boston area. By 1979 he had moved to Los Angeles, where he worked in Ma Maison under the supervision of chef Wolfgang Puck. In 1982, he moved with his wife Fiona to Nice, France where they shopped and ate French food. A year later he came back to Boston and got a job with Lydia Shire at Boston's Copley Plaza Hotel. Four years later, he and his wife Fiona opened Hamersley's Bistro on Tremont Street where they served French cuisine.

When asked "Who has been your biggest culinary inspiration?", he responded:

Hamersley's Bistro closed in the end of October 2014.

In January 2015, Hamersley began writing a food column for The Boston Globe.

In its Spring 2014 issue, the quarterly Upland Almanac introduced Hamersley as its "Upland Kitchen" columnist.

Honors and awards
Hammersley's Bistro became very popular among eaters and received positive reviews while Food & Wine magazine called the owner one of the "Ten Best New Chefs for 1988". From 1988 to 1993 he was nominated for the James Beard Award and received it only by 1995. A year later, his restaurant got a "Hall of Fame" award from Boston magazine and from 1988 to 1995 was ranked as the Best of Boston. In 1997,  The Boston Globe gave his bistro a four-star rating. Currently he is a member of the New England Culinary Institute board of advisors.

References

Living people
20th-century births
Chefs from Massachusetts
American male chefs
Date of birth missing (living people)
American restaurateurs
Restaurant founders
Boston University School of Education alumni
James Beard Foundation Award winners
Year of birth missing (living people)
American cookbook writers
Cookbook writers